The Pinnacle is a Canadian peak in the Cape Breton Highlands, with an elevation of .  The Pinnacle is the second highest elevation point in the province of Nova Scotia, and the highest in Inverness County, Nova Scotia.

The Pinnacle is located within the Cape Breton Highlands National Park. Its nearest neighbour, of almost the same height, is the Bakeapple Barren Northeast, which lies just  to the east. The Pinnacle is only  from White Hill, the highest point in Nova Scotia, further off to the east.

This peak is the highpoint of Rocky Barren, which lies at the headwaters of the MacKenzies and Chéticamp rivers on Cape Breton Highlands.

Hiking
The nearest access point is a seasonal gravel road that leads to Fishing Cove Lake to the northwest.

References

External links
Peakbagger - The Pinnacle, Nova Scotia

Mountains of Nova Scotia
Landforms of Inverness County, Nova Scotia
Mountains of Canada under 1000 metres